The Honda XL350R is a dual-sport motorcycle made by Honda in 1984–1985. Both Cycle World and Cycle ranked it as one of the ten best motorcycles of 1985.

Specifications
The engine is an air cooled single cylinder, four-stroke with a displacement of 340.00 ccm (20.75 cubic inches) making 27.00 HP (19.7 kW)) @ 7500 RPM.
Its top speed is 134.0 km/h (83.3 mph).
It uses a 6-speed gearbox.
The front brakes are single disc and with rear drum brakes.

Notes

References

 
 

XL350R
Vehicles introduced in 1984
Dual-sport motorcycles